NGC 519, also occasionally referred to as PGC 5182 is an elliptical galaxy located approximately 242 million light-years from the Solar System in the constellation Cetus. It was discovered on 20 November 1886 by astronomer Lewis Swift.

Observation history 
Swift discovered the object along with NGC 530, 538 and 557 using a 16-inch refractor telescope at the Warner Observatory. It was later catalogued by John Louis Emil Dreyer in the New General Catalogue, where the galaxy was described as "most extremely faint, very small, round, very difficult".

Description 
The galaxy appears very dim in the sky as it only has an apparent visual magnitude of 14.4. It can be classified as type E using the Hubble Sequence. The object's distance of roughly 240 million light-years from the Solar System can be estimated using its redshift and Hubble's law.

See also  
 List of NGC objects (1–1000)

References

External links 

 
 SEDS

Elliptical galaxies
Cetus (constellation)
0519
5182
Astronomical objects discovered in 1886
Discoveries by Lewis Swift